Ukraine competed at the 2018 Winter Olympics in Pyeongchang, South Korea, from 9 to 25 February 2018, with 33 competitors in 9 sports. Oleksandr Abramenko won the only medal for the country, a gold in men's aerials freestyle skiing, earning Ukraine the 21st place in the overall medal table.

Medalists

Competitors
The following is the list of number of competitors participating at the Games per sport/discipline.

Alpine skiing 

Ukraine has qualified at least one male and one female athlete for alpine skiing.

Biathlon 

Based on their Nations Cup rankings in the 2016–17 Biathlon World Cup, Ukraine has qualified a team of 5 men and 6 women. Olena Pidhrushna was selected for the team, but did not take part in the races.

Men

Women

Mixed

Cross-country skiing

Four skiers will represent Ukraine in cross-country skiing.

Distance

Sprint

Figure skating 

Ukraine qualified an ice dancing team, based on its placement at the 2017 World Figure Skating Championships in Helsinki, Finland.  They additionally qualified one male and one female figure skater through the 2017 CS Nebelhorn Trophy. The team was announced on December 19, 2017.

Freestyle skiing

Three skiers will represent Ukraine in freestyle skiing.

Aerials

Moguls

Luge 

Based on the results from the World during the 2017–18 Luge World Cup season, Ukraine qualified 5 sleds.

Mixed team relay

Nordic combined 

One skier will represent Ukraine in Nordic combined.

Skeleton 

Ukraine qualified 1 sled, making its Olympic debut in the sport of skeleton.

Snowboarding 

One athlete will represent Ukraine in snowboarding.

Parallel

References

Nations at the 2018 Winter Olympics
2018
Winter Olympics